Willi Haag (born 6 August 1944) is a retired German football defender and later manager.

References

1944 births
Living people
German footballers
SV Eintracht Trier 05 players
Bayer 04 Leverkusen players
SC Preußen Münster players
Alemannia Aachen players
Association football defenders
2. Bundesliga players
German football managers
Alemannia Aachen managers